Otto Alencar (born August 28, 1947) is a Brazilian politician. He has represented Bahia in the Federal Senate since 2015. Previously he was vice-governor and governor of Bahia. He is a member of the Social Democratic Party. State Present of Social Democratic Party on Bahia

References

1947 births
Living people
People from Bahia
Federal University of Bahia alumni
Social Democratic Party (Brazil, 2011) politicians
Members of the Federal Senate (Brazil)
Governors of Bahia